Sven Kaldre (born 31 October 1991) is a professional basketball player who plays as a shooting guard. He currently plays for Rapla.

International career
Kaldre is a member of the Estonia men's national basketball team since 2014.

References

External links
Profile at Eurobasket

1991 births
Living people
BC Rakvere Tarvas players
BC Valga players
Estonian men's basketball players
Força Lleida CE players
Korvpalli Meistriliiga players
People from Mustvee Parish
Rapla KK players
Shooting guards
University of Tartu basketball team players